Events from the year 1642 in Denmark.

Incumbents
 Monarch – Christian IV
 Steward of the Realm – Corfitz Ulfeldt

Events
Hannibal Sehested is appointed Governor-General of Norway.

Births

Deaths
 19 February - Jørgen Knudsen Urne, statesman (born 1598)

References

 
Denmark
Years of the 17th century in Denmark